The Ice Pirates is a 1984 American comic science fiction film directed by Stewart Raffill, who co-wrote the screenplay with Krull writer Stanford Sherman. The film stars Robert Urich, Mary Crosby and Michael D. Roberts; other notable featured actors are Anjelica Huston, Ron Perlman, Bruce Vilanch, John Carradine and former football player John Matuszak.

Plot
In a distant future, water is so scarce and rationed that it is considered an immensely valuable substance, both as a commodity and as a currency in ice cubes. The Templars of Mithra control the water and they destroy worlds that have natural water, leaving the galaxy virtually dry. Pirates dedicate their lives to raiding ships and looting the ice from the cargo holds to make a living.

Jason is the leader of a band of pirates that raid a Templar cruiser for its ice, and discover the beautiful princess Karina in a stasis pod. He decides to kidnap her, waking her up, and alarming the Templars. Jason and his pirates flee, but are pursued by Templar ships. Jason lets some of his crew, Maida and Zeno, escape while Roscoe stays to help Jason. Both Jason and Roscoe are captured.

After their capture, they meet Killjoy on their way to become slaves but first they will be 'redesigned': castrated and lobotomized. As Roscoe and Jason are shuffled into the processing facility, Killjoy walks past in a stolen monk's habit as priests are spared "just in case".  Our heroes are spared this fate, however, when Princess Karina intervenes and purchases them as her slaves, having them work as servants. That evening, they are reunited with Killjoy (disguised as a robot). Jason, Karina, Roscoe, Killjoy, Karina's servant Nanny and her robot butler Percy manage to leave the planet before the Supreme Commander arrives to arrest her.

Princess Karina hires Jason so she can find her father, who has gone missing while searching for the so-called "Seventh World": a lost, mythic planet rumored to contain vast reserves of water. The existence of such a world would threaten the Templars' water monopoly, and therefore their hold on power. The Supreme Commander of the Templars orders Zorn to pursue Princess Karina in order to locate the Seventh World for the Templars.

At some point, Jason keeps a secret that a nasty creature is hiding in their spaceship. Later, they are about to eat a turkey when the creature bursts out of it and runs away. On their next planet, Jason and Roscoe are reunited with their fellow pirates, Maida and Zeno. They proceed to locate the "lost" planet, which contains massive amounts of water and protected by a time-distortion field. The planet must be approached on a specific course or the ship will be lost in time forever. As the heroes' ship enters the distortion field, Zorn pursues and attacks them with a host of Templars and robots. This results in a climactic battle as time randomly speeds up and everyone quickly ages into extreme old age.

In the end, the day is saved by the now-adult son of Karina and Jason, the result of a romantic tryst just before entering the time distortion field. As the heroes exit the field, everyone's ages regress to what they originally were, leaving Jason and Karina with the knowledge that they will have a child together. The Templar ship has disappeared as it veered off the designated course during the attack and has now become lost in time for eternity. The crew looks on as they approach the Seventh World, which is revealed to be Earth.

Cast
 Robert Urich as Jason
 Mary Crosby as Princess Karina
 Michael D. Roberts as Roscoe
 Anjelica Huston as Maida
 Ron Perlman as Zeno
 Bruce Vilanch as Wendon
 John Carradine as Supreme Commander
 John Matuszak as "Killjoy"
 Ian Abercrombie as Hymie
 Alan Caillou as Count Paisley
 Natalie Core as Nanny
 Jeremy West as Zorn
 Rockne Tarkington as "Patch"
 Patty Maloney as Waitress
 Ron Taylor as The Voice of The Pimp Robot

Production
The film was made at MGM, then under David Begelman, with John Foreman as producer. It was originally called The Water Planet and had a $20 million budget, based on a script by Stanford Sherman, writer of Krull. However, as MGM was in financial difficulty, its bankers put a limit of $8 million on all films. Begelman and Foreman contacted Stewart Raffill, whose film High Risk (1981) had impressed them. Raffill said he would have to rewrite it and make it more comic, and they agreed. Rafill and Foreman said pirate movies like The Crimson Pirate were the main inspiration and they deliberately did not watch Star Wars.

MGM had a contract with Robert Urich to make a TV series and insisted on him being cast. John Foreman wanted Anjelica Huston, a personal friend, in the film. John Matuszak was cast because one of the financiers liked him. "It wasn’t my concept," Rafill added. "We just put everything we could in it to make a joke and funny and told the story." Filming started March 1983. "We got lots of high-tech parts from car engines and gearings and poured molds out of them," said Rafill. "We didn't want to be sleek and 
spaceship-like, but rather a kind of super-funky, steam engine high-tech, with pistons and gearing — a real hodgepodge. The idea was that these space pirates didn't have good equipment, and had to make do with whatever they could find."

Production was difficult due in part to MGM getting a new studio head, Frank Yablans. Raffill says the film "ended up being a fiasco... MGM went through a transition and they brought in a new guy, who was eventually found out to be stealing money from the company. He was a little problematic sort of a fellow. And he had a bad time with John Foreman so he tried to sabotage the film. Pulled the money out on them, but we did finish it." Raffill says "Turns out the producer was a close friend of Paul Newman's and the studio head had said something derogatory about Paul Newman's wife and so the producer had punched him!" "At the end of the film, they were meant to arrive at Earth and they fly over the beaches of Malibu with everyone swimming in the water and the studio head cut that out! He never told me and it was gone. I had to drink vodka to calm myself down."

Reception
The film is somewhat tongue-in-cheek and often compared to Star Wars. Upon its release, the New York Times described it as a "busy, bewildering, exceedingly jokey science-fiction film that looks like a Star Wars spin-off made in an underdeveloped galaxy."

On Rotten Tomatoes it has an approval rating of 17% based on reviews from 12 critics.

In a slightly more positive retrospective review, Jay Bauman and Rich Evans of Red Letter Media praised the ridiculous and chaotic nature of the film's structure and plot while noting that its production and budget issues gave the film a certain charm.

See also
 List of American films of 1984
 List of space pirates

References

Notes

External links
 
 
 
 
 
 Badmovies.org reader review
 Sound samples of the film score

1984 films
1980s science fiction comedy films
American science fiction comedy films
American space adventure films
American satirical films
Films about water
Films about water scarcity
Films directed by Stewart Raffill
Puppet films
Films produced by John Foreman (producer)
Films scored by Bruce Broughton
Films set on fictional planets
Films shot in California
Films shot in Los Angeles
Pirate films
Space pirates
Water scarcity in fiction
Metro-Goldwyn-Mayer films
1984 comedy films
1980s English-language films
1980s American films